Hosta plantaginea, the fragrant plantain lily or August lily, is a species of flowering plant in the family Asparagaceae, native to southeast and south-central China, and a garden escapee in scattered locations worldwide. It and cultivars and hybrids derived from it are the only fragrant hostas. As a wild plant it is typically found growing in the herb layer of mountain forests, below 2000m.

References

plantaginea
Garden plants of Asia
Endemic flora of China
Flora of South-Central China
Flora of Southeast China
Plants described in 1863